The MNL-2 2016 is the Myanmar National League's fourth full regular season. Four new clubs will join in 2016 MNL-2. There are Mahar United Football Club (MU FC), United of Thanlyin Football Club, Thihadeepa United Football Club (TU FC) and City Stars Football Club (CS FC). 2016 MNL-2 will start on 15 January. New clubs must play a qualifying round. Only three clubs will qualify to play in MNL-2.

Standings

Matches

Fixtures and Results of the 2016 MNL-2 season.

Week 1

Week 2

Week 3

Week 4

Week 5

Week 6

Week 7

Week 8

Week 9

Week 10

Week 11

Week 12

Week 13

Week 14

Week 15

Week 16

Week 17

Week 18

Week 19

Week 20

Week 21

Week 22

References
MNL-2 Fixture

External links
 Myanmar National League Official Website
 Myanmar National League Facebook Official Page

MNL-2 seasons
1
Myanmar
Myanmar